The R104 is a regional route in South Africa that is the designation for some of the old sections of roads that were previously the N4, prior to upgrading. It connects Pretoria with Middelburg in Mpumalanga via Bronkhorstspruit and Witbank. It also connects Pretoria with Rustenburg in the North West province via Hartbeespoort and Mooinooi.

The R104 is also made up of a road in Nelspruit (Mbombela) which was previously part of the N4 national route. As the N4 bypasses the central part of the city to the north on a newer highway (opened on 13 June 2010), the old short road through Nelspruit central (Samora Machel Drive) is now designated as the R104.

Route

Mpumalanga
The R104 route begins just west of Wonderfontein in Mpumalanga (east of Middelburg), at an intersection with the N4 national route (Maputo Corridor) (Pretoria-Maputo Highway).  It heads west for about 50 km to reach Middelburg, where it meets the N11 national route coming from the south just before the Eastdene suburb, which marks the end of the first section.

The R104 designation is used again in Witbank (eMalahleni), from the Witbank Long Distance Taxi Rank (at the western end of the town centre), at a junction with the R544 coming from Verena and the R555 coming from Middelburg. The R104 starts as the road to the south-west from the taxi rank (Diederichs Street). It then enters the Schoongezicht suburb, where it crosses to the south of the N4 Highway as Kaldine Drive, turns west and bypasses Witbank Primary School as Collins Avenue.

It continues westwards, bypassing KwaGuqa (where it makes a right and left turn) and remains south of the N4 Highway up to Balmoral, at the northern terminus of the R545, where it goes back to being north of the N4 Highway. It crosses into Gauteng Province just after.

Gauteng
The entire Gauteng section of the R104 is in the City of Tshwane Metropolitan Municipality. Into Gauteng, the R104 remains north of and parallel to the N4 Highway and remains one road westwards for 75 kilometres, through Bronkhorstspruit (where it meets the R25 Route and the R513 Route), meeting the R568 and the R515 routes, bypassing Mamelodi, to reach Pretoria Central.

In Pretoria, after flying-over the N1/N4 Highway co-signage (Pretoria Eastern Bypass) as Pretoria Street, it continues as Stanza Bopape Street (formerly Church Street) up to the M3 junction, where it becomes Helen Joseph Street (formerly Church Street) through the Central Business District. It goes around Church Square before becoming WF Nkomo Street (formerly Church Street) and intersecting with the R101 Route. In Pretoria West, from the junction with the R55 Route westwards, the R104 route is south of and parallel to the M4 Magalies Toll Route for 20 km up to its end at the Pelindaba Toll Plaza just south-east of Hartbeespoort.

South of Flora Park (east of Pelindaba), the R101 meets the R511 Road at a 4-way junction. As the road westwards (Elias Motsoaledi Street) continues to Pelindaba and Broederstroom, the R104 joins the R511 to be cosigned with it north-west from this junction, flying over the M4 Magalies Toll Route's Pelindaba Toll Plaza. At Flora Park, the R104/R511 co-signage leaves the City of Tshwane Metropolitan Municipality and crosses into Hartbeespoort in the North-West Province as Beethoven Street.

North West
In Hartbeespoort, at the junction with Bach Street next to the Sediba Shopping Plaza in the suburb of Melodie, the R511 becomes the road northwards towards Brits, leaving the R104 as the west-north-westerly road. After this junction, the R104 becomes Scott Street and makes up the northern border of the suburb of Schoemansville. West of Schoemansville, the R104 crosses the Hartbeespoort Dam wall on the Crocodile River as a bridge in which only vehicles going one direction can cross at a time (using a traffic light system), before reaching a 4-way junction in the suburb of Damdoryn.

At this intersection, the R104 continues westwards, passing the Elephant Sanctuary of Hartbeespoort. After a few kilometres, it meets a road heading northwards towards Brits before continuing west towards Mooinooi.

From Hartbeespoort, going past Mooinooi, the R104 is parallel to and south of the N4 Highway (which is now called the Platinum Highway). At Kroondal (just before Rustenburg), the R104 goes north of the Platinum Highway and makes a left and right turn before making a direct line for Rustenburg. It meets the north-western end of the R24 Road from Magaliesburg, Krugersdorp and Johannesburg, before becoming the main route through Rustenburg Central and meeting the southern terminus of the R510 Road. After the Tlhabane suburb, the R104 meets the southern terminus of the R565 Road before ending where it meets the N4 (eastbound only).

R104 (Nelspruit)

As there is a northern bypass which was built around Nelspruit (Mbombela) (continuous highway; off-ramp junctions only) in the Mpumalanga Province for the N4 National Route (opened on 13 June 2010), the old 17km section of road through Mbombela Central (Samora Machel Drive) has been designated as the R104.

References

External links
 Routes Travel Info

Regional Routes in Gauteng
Regional Routes in Mpumalanga
Regional Routes in North West (South African province)